Anthony Wroblicky (born July 12, 1992) is an American professional basketball player who played for Telekom Baskets Bonn of the German Basketball League in the 2014–15 season.

References

External links
 German BBL Profile
 Eurobasket Profile

1992 births
Living people
American Eagles men's basketball players
American expatriate basketball people in Germany
American men's basketball players
Basketball players from Los Angeles
Centers (basketball)
People from Harbor City, Los Angeles
Telekom Baskets Bonn players